Somewhere in Africa: The Cries of humanity is a 2011 Ghanaian Nigerian drama film directed by Frank Rajah Arase, starring Majid Michel, Martha Ankomah and Kofi Adjorlolo. It received 7 nominations at the 9th Africa Movie Academy Awards including categories: Best Actor in a Leading Role, Achievement in Soundtrack, Achievement in Visual effects and Achievement in Make-Up. Majid Michel was the recipient of the film's only award.

Cast
Majid Michel  as General Yusuf Mombasa
Majid Michel as Frank Leuma, Reverend Francis Jackson
Martha Ankomah as Nivera
Eddie Nartey   as Pascal
Kofi Adjorlolo as General Olemba
Roselyn Ngissah as Captain Rajile
David Dontoh as President Gabiza

Reception
Nollywood Reinvented gave it a 43% rating, praised its soundtrack, cinematography and screenplay.

Awards
It received 7 nominations at the 9th Africa Movie Academy Awards for categories: Achievement in Production Design, Achievement in Costume Design, Achievement in Make-Up, Achievement in Soundtrack, Achievement in Visual effects, Best Young/Promising Actor, and Best Actor in a Leading Role. Majid Michel was the recipient of the film's only award.

References

2011 films
2011 drama films
Nigerian drama films
Ghanaian drama films
English-language Nigerian films
English-language Ghanaian films
2010s English-language films